Arctomelon stearnsii is a species of sea snail, a marine gastropod mollusk in the family Volutidae, the volutes.

Subspecies
 Arctomelon stearnsii ryosukei Habe & Ito, 1965 
 Arctomelon stearnsii stearnsii (Dall, 1872)

Description

Distribution

References

 Turgeon, D.; Quinn, J.F.; Bogan, A.E.; Coan, E.V.; Hochberg, F.G.; Lyons, W.G.; Mikkelsen, P.M.; Neves, R.J.; Roper, C.F.E.; Rosenberg, G.; Roth, B.; Scheltema, A.; Thompson, F.G.; Vecchione, M.; Williams, J.D. (1998). Common and scientific names of aquatic invertebrates from the United States and Canada: mollusks. 2nd ed. American Fisheries Society Special Publication, 26. American Fisheries Society: Bethesda, MD (USA). . IX, 526 + cd-rom pp. 
 Bail, P & Poppe, G. T. 2001. A conchological iconography: a taxonomic introduction of the recent Volutidae. Hackenheim-Conchbook, 30 pp, 5 pl. (

Volutidae
Gastropods described in 1872